To Grab the Ring is a 1968 Dutch film directed by Nikolai van der Heyde. It was entered into the 18th Berlin International Film Festival.

Cast
 Ben Carruthers as Alfred Lowell, Acteur
 Françoise Brion as Hélène
 Liesbeth List as Sandra van Dijk
 Al Mancini as David Knight
 Vladek Sheybal as Mijnheer Smith
 Edina Ronay as Vriendin
 Dunja Rajter
 John Van de Rest
 Jan Vreeken as Gangster
 Joop Admiraal
 Cox Habbema
 Melvin Clay as Anush
 Ko Koedijk
 Simon van Collem

See also
List of Dutch films

References

External links

1968 films
1960s Dutch-language films
Dutch black-and-white films
Films directed by Nikolai van der Heyde